Vrije Academie voor Beeldende Kunsten (Free Academy of Visual Art) was an art school in The Hague, Netherlands. It was founded in 1947 by Livinus van de Bundt. The last remaining part of the school, GEMAK, closed on December 4, 2015, after a 75% cut in its funding from the city of The Hague. The final product of the school was the publication Exit GEMAK: All Art is Political | Kunst = Politiek.

Directors 
 1947–1964 Livinus van de Bundt
 1964–1982 George Lampe
 1982–1984 team ad interim: Wil Bouthoorn, Stan Spoorenberg, Dieter Ludwig
 1884–1988 Frans Zwartjes
 1988–2001 Bob Bonies
 2001–2009 Ingrid Rollema
 2009–2015 Marie Jeanne de Rooij

Notable Students 
 Hans Citroen
 Paul Citroen
 Jan Cremer
 Max Velthuijs
 Corneel Verlaan
 Co Westerik
 Martin Sjardijn

References

External links 
 Official website

Art schools in the Netherlands
Organisations based in The Hague